The Kuwaiti Government-in-exile was the government-in-exile of Kuwait following the Ba'athist Iraqi invasion and occupation of Kuwait, during the Gulf War. On 2 August 1990, Sheikh Jaber Al-Ahmad Al-Jaber Al-Sabah and senior members of his government fled to Saudi Arabia, where they set up a government-in-exile in Ta'if. The Kuwaiti government in exile was far more affluent than most other such governments, having full disposal of the very considerable Kuwaiti assets in western banks—of which it made use to conduct a massive propaganda campaign denouncing the Ba'athist Iraqi occupation and mobilizing public opinion in the western hemisphere in favor of war with Ba'athist Iraq. In March 1991, following the defeat of Ba'athist Iraq at the hands of coalition forces in the Persian Gulf War, the Sheikh and his government were able to return to Kuwait.

See also
Gulf War (Scandal)
 Invasion of Kuwait
 Republic of Kuwait
 Kuwait Governorate

References

1990s in Kuwait
Former governments in exile